Centromerita is a genus of dwarf spiders that was first described by David B. Hirst in 1912.  it contains only two species: C. bicolor and C. concinna.

See also
 List of Linyphiidae species

References

Araneomorphae genera
Linyphiidae
Palearctic spiders
Spiders of North America
Taxa named by Friedrich Dahl